Potamonautes mutandensis is an endangered species of freshwater crab in the family Potamonautidae. It is found in Lake Mutanda and Lake Kivu in Uganda, Rwanda and DR Congo.

References

Potamoidea
Freshwater crustaceans of Africa
Crustaceans described in 1953
Taxonomy articles created by Polbot